Lambda Andromedae, Latinized from λ Andromedae, is the Bayer designation for a binary star system in the northern constellation of Andromeda. This is bright enough to be seen with the naked eye. The system is drifting further away from the Sun with a radial velocity of +6.8 km/s.

Properties

Lambda Andromedae is a single-lined spectroscopic binary with an orbital period of 20.5212 days. The spectrum of the primary matches a stellar classification of G8 III-IV, suggesting that it is an evolved star that lies part way between the subgiant and giant stages. The mass of this star is similar to the Sun, but it has expanded to around seven times the Sun's radius. It is radiating over 28 times the luminosity of the Sun from its outer envelope at an effective temperature of 4,800 K, giving it the characteristic yellow hue of a G-type star.

This is an RS Canum Venaticorum variable and its brightness varies by 0.225 magnitudes, reaching a maximum of 3.70, with a period of 53.952 days. Such variability is theorized to occur because of tidal friction, which results in chromospheric activity. However, the orbit of this system is nearly circular, so the cause of this system's variability remains uncertain. A magnetic field with an average strength of  has been detected on this star, which is stronger than the field on the Sun.

Naming

Evolution
Many different spectral classes have been published for λ Andromedae, ranging from G6 to K1.  Most sources give a luminosity class of III (giant) or IV (subgiant).  Analysis of the physical properties of the star, including its temperature, luminosity, magnetic field, and stellar wind, show that it has recently experienced the first dredge-up and has begun to ascend the red giant branch although it still has a hot corona and is classified as a subgiant by some definitions.

References

External links
 http://www.alcyone-software.com/cgi-bin/search.pl?object=HR8961 
 Image Lambda Andromedae

G-type giants
G-type subgiants
RS Canum Venaticorum variables
Spectroscopic binaries

Andromeda (constellation)
Andromedae, Lambda
BD+45 4283
Andromedae, 16
9832
222107
116584
8961